Chintamani is a 1956 Indian Telugu-language film, produced and directed by P. S. Ramakrishna Rao. It stars P. Bhanumathi, N. T. Rama Rao, and Jamuna, with music composed by Addepalli Rama Rao and T. V. Raju. The film is based on the play of the same name, written by Kallakuri Narayana Rao.

Plot 
Chintamani, a prostitute, is a devotee of Krishna. Krishna, to test Chintamani and other people, comes to earth as sage along with Rukmini. Bhavani Shankarudu, a Brahmin, out of lust toward Chintamani gives away all his wealth. Even then, Chintamani's mother Srihari is not satisfied and asks Chintamani to lure Subbi Shetty, a merchant, and halfheartedly Chintamani snatches Subbi Shetty's property too. Bellvamangaludu, son of Vasudeva Murthy, is a gold merchant. Radha is his dedicated wife. Bhavani Shankarudu takes him to Chintamani and they both get attracted to each other. Vasudeva Murthy becomes sick after knowing about this affair and dies pleading to his son to leave Chintamani and take care of his wife Radha. But Bellvamangaludu, out of lust, leaves his dead father and goes to Chintamani. After seeing his bloodied clothes, she inquires about it and he says he came up with the help of a creeper, but it is a snake. Still worse than this, he, with help of his wife's dead body swims to the other side of the river to reach her. Chintamani scolds him. Chintamani and Bellvamangaludu realize their mistakes and start hating themselves. Krishna gives enlightenment to Chintamani. She leaves the village giving all her property and becomes a wanderer. After completing his wife's funeral, Bellvamangaludu burns his eyes as contrition for his sins. Then he becomes a great devotee of Krishna and starts living in an Ashram. Chintamani also reaches there and serves Bellvamangaludu. Krishna in a sage form watches all these happenings and decides to give salvation to both of them. But Rukmini obstructs his way, how could he do so for a prostitute and a person who became blind with lust. Then he makes a test, he takes a liquid in a pot and asks great saints to identify its fragrance, which no one can answer. Bellvamangaludu, without eyes, recognizes it as the fragrance of Lord Krishna. At last, Krishna gives Darshan to them by giving back Bellvamangaludu's eyes. The film ends with Krishna giving salvation to Chintamani and Bellvamangaludu.

Cast 
P. Bhanumathi as Chintamani
N. T. Rama Rao as Bellvamangaludu
Jamuna as Radha
S. V. Ranga Rao as Bhavani Shankarudu
Relangi as Subbi Shetty
Raghuramaiah as Lord Krishna
Rushyendramani as Srihari
Chaya Devi as Mani
Prabhavathi as Rukmini
Leelarani as Chitra
Mikkilineni as Bhagavantham
 Dr kamaraju
 Addala Narayana Rao
 RV Krishna Rao
 Boddapati Krishna Rao
 Venkata rathnam
 Krishna Prasad

Soundtrack 

Music composed by Addepalli Rama Rao & T. V. Raju. Lyrics were written by Ravuru.

References

External links 
 

Films about courtesans in India
Films scored by T. V. Raju
Films scored by Addepalli Rama Rao
Hindu devotional films
Indian biographical drama films
Indian films based on plays
Indian drama films
Indian black-and-white films
1956 drama films